Paolo Milanoli (born 7 December 1969) is an Italian former fencer. He won a gold medal in the team épée event at the 2000 Summer Olympics.

References

External links
 

1969 births
Living people
Italian male fencers
Olympic fencers of Italy
Fencers at the 2000 Summer Olympics
Olympic gold medalists for Italy
Olympic medalists in fencing
People from Alessandria
Medalists at the 2000 Summer Olympics
Universiade medalists in fencing
Mediterranean Games gold medalists for Italy
Mediterranean Games medalists in fencing
Competitors at the 2001 Mediterranean Games
Universiade silver medalists for Italy
Medalists at the 1995 Summer Universiade
Sportspeople from the Province of Alessandria